Faraday is a township in the Canadian province of Ontario, located within Hastings County adjacent to the town of Bancroft.

History
The township of Faraday was first settled 1857, when iron ore deposits were discovered.

Prior to the 1922 discovery of uranium, mica, feldspar, and other minerals were mined on a small scale in area. Inspired by finds of gold in nearby Eldorado (now Madoc) in 1886–7 and onwards, many people moved to the area hoping to find gold.

The Barker Quarries operated South of Marble Lake sporadically from 1908 into the late 1930s providing marble for government buildings in Ottawa and Casa Loma and the Royal Ontario Museum in Toronto.

After the second world war, and the invention of atomic energy, a global demand for uranium increased and the Canadian government permitted uranium prospecting.

Arthur H. Shore, an independent prospector, first found uranium at his lot on Faraday township in 1948 or 1949. He founded Faraday Uranium Mines Limited in 1949, but injured himself shortly afterwards. The mine was active from 1957 to 1964 and then reopened as the Madawaksa Mine from 1975 to 1982.

The Greyhawk Uranium mine was active from 1955 to 1959 and reopened from 1962 to 1982.

The mines attracted workers to the area and housing for mine executives was built in Faraday and for workers in nearby Bancroft. The closure of the mines when the global supply for uranium diminished created significant hardship for the area.

Communities
The township of Faraday comprises a number of villages and hamlets, including the following communities such as Bow Lake, Faraday, Monck Road, and Paudash.

Demographics 

Mother tongue:
 English as first language: 94.6%
 French as first language: 0.6%
 English and French as first language: 0%
 Other as first language: 4.7%

See also
List of townships in Ontario

References

External links

Township municipalities in Ontario
Lower-tier municipalities in Ontario
Municipalities in Hastings County